is a sports venue located in Albertville, France. It hosted speed skating events at the 1992 Winter Olympics.

The stands, which remain present, were constructed as an airfoil from aerospace designs.

The track serves nowadays as a multipurpose stadium used for athletics and football events.

References
1992 Winter Olympics official report. pp. 84–7. 

Olympic speed skating venues
Venues of the 1992 Winter Olympics
Speed skating venues in France
Sports venues in Savoie
Sports venues completed in 1991